Pranciška Regina Liubertaitė is Lithuanian poet and novelist.

Early life 
Liubertaitė was born on January 1, 1950, in the village of Lioliai, the district of Kėdainiai. In 1966 she graduated from the Šėta secondary school of the same district and entered the Faculty of Philology at Vilnius University. In 1972 she graduated from Vilnius University with a diploma of a philologist and a teacher of Lithuanian language and literature.

Career 
From 1972 to 1981, she worked as a teacher at the Pabiržė Secondary School, at the Biržai secondary schools No 1 and No 2, at the Public Library and the Department of Culture. 

In 1981, she moved to Vilnius. She has been working as a make-up editor for many different institutions and publishing houses in Vilnius.

The first poems appeared in the local press of Kėdainiai and Biržai. Some time later, her first works of prose were published in the XXI amzius, and her poems were published in the weekly Šeimininkė and Šiaurės Atėnai. Around 1998 she became more active in literary and cultural life. Her publications on different cultural and linguistic issues can be found in Dienovidis, Literatūra ir menas, Šiaurės Atėnai, XXI amžius and Lietuvos Aidas.

Works

Poetry 

 Signs of Hope (Vilties ženklai), 2001 –  
 A Forgotten Diary (Uzmirštas dienorastis), 2001 –  
 Walking Only Once on the Earth (Vaikštau tik kartą žeme...), 2002 – 
 Towards White Space (Į baltą erdvę...), 2004 – 
 The Scrapes (Įdrėskimai), Ciklonas – Vilnius, 2006 – 
 100 Haiku for Vilnius (Šimtas haiku Vilniui), Ciklonas – Vilnius, 2008 –  
 The Blinking Glow (Mirksnio švytėjimas), Ciklonas – Vilnius, 2008 –  
 Fatal Mirages (Dūžtantys miražai), Ciklonas – Vilnius, 2011 – 
 Crochet Embroidery (Siuvinėjimas kryžiuku), Ciklonas – Vilnius, 2014 – /http://www.voruta.lt/arvydas-genys-nebenoriu-daugiau-tos-spalvos/
 Spark to the Earth [A poetry collection] (Žiežirba į žemę), 2016 – /https://www.rasyk.lt/knygos/ziezirba-i-zeme/4556.html
 In the Faintness of Shadows (Šešėlių blankumoj), Ciklonas – Vilnius, 2019 –  /https://www.rasyk.lt/knygos/seseliu-blankumoj/4591.html
 Love in the hour of silence (Mylėk tylos valandoj), Homoliber – Vilnius, 2021– 
 Blooming of flaps [selected lyrics] (Atverčių žydėjimas) [atrinktinė lyrika], Homoliber – Vilnius, 2022 – 
 Withstanding the winds [selected lyrics] (Atlaikant vėjus) [atrinktinė lyrika], Homoliber – Vilnius, 2023 –

Novels 

 By Roads of Memory (Atminties keliais), Vyturys – Vilnius, 2000 – 
 The Scream (Šauksmas) – Ciklonas – Vilnius, 2005 – 
 Elegy of the Past (Praeities elegija), Ciklonas – Vilnius, 2005 – 
 Remembrance Photos [a fragmented novel] (Nuotraukos atminčiai), Ciklonas – Vilnius, 2009 – 
 (No) home Coziness [A novel collection] (Ne) pradingęs namų jaukumas), Ciklonas – Vilnius, 2019 –

Sources 

 A. Genys. „Nebenoriu daugiau tos spalvos…“ (about book of poetry "Crochet Embroidery", 2014). – Voruta, 2015 12 15
 A. Genys. Vientisumu kaip laiko inversija (about a poetry collection "Spark to the Earth", 2016) – interneto svetainė www. rasyk. lt
 A. Genys. Koks šios prozos rinktinės credo? (about A novel collection "(No) home Coziness") – interneto svetainė www.rasyk.lt
 E. Kulvietienė. Laiko padiktuotas dabarties pasaulis (about novel "The Scream"). – interneto svetainė www.bernardinai.lt
 E. Kulvietienė. Tarp praeities tikroviškos kasdienybės ir nostalgijos (about "Elegy of the Past"). – interneto svetainė www. bernardinai. lt
 M. Poisson. Skausmo difuzija (about novel "The Scream"). – interneto svetainė www.rasyk.lt
 M. Poisson. Apie Pranciškos Reginos Liubertaitės „Įdrėskimus“ arba Būtis nebūtin atsivėrusi. – interneto svetainė www. rasyk. lt
 A. Valentukevičiūtė. Maži epizodai iš gyvenimo visumos (about "By Roads of Memory"). – interneto svetainė www. rasyk. lt
 A. Valentukevičiūtė. Mintys apie praėjusias dienas (about "A Forgotten Diary"). – interneto svetainė www. rasyk. lt
 A. Valentukevičiūtė. „Aš tavo lemtis, su tavim kelyje“ (about "Signs of Hope"). – interneto svetainė www. rasyk. lt
 A. Valentukevičiūtė. „Dabar tik supratau žaidžiau… gyvenimą“ (about "Walking Only Once on the Earth"). – interneto svetainė www. rasyk. lt
 A. Valentukevičiūtė. Iš baltų erdvių (apie poezijos knygą "Towards White Space"). – interneto svetainė www. rasyk. lt
 A. Valentukevičiūtė. Kas valdo žmogaus gyvenimą? (about novel "The Scream"). – interneto svetainė www. rasyk. lt
 A. Valentukevičiūtė. Savęs tyrinėjimas (about "The Scrapes"). – interneto svetainė www. rasyk. lt

External links 
 
 Eilėraščiai
 
 
 

1950 births
Living people
21st-century Lithuanian writers
21st-century Lithuanian women writers